The Mapuá Extractive Reserve is an extractive reserve in the state of Pará, Brazil.

Location

The Mapuá Extractive Reserve is in the municipality of Breves, Pará.
It is on the island of Marajó to the northwest of Belém in the delta region where the Amazon and Tocantins rivers empty into the Atlantic Ocean.
It is contained within the  Marajó Archipelago Environmental Protection Area, established in 1989.
The Mapuá River, a left tributary of the Aramã, runs along the reserve's southern boundary. The Aramá River forms the northern boundary in the western part of the reserve.
It adjoins the Terra Grande-Pracuúba Extractive Reserve to the east.

The reserve is in the Amazon biome.
It contains sheets of tidal water and mangroves.
The reserve is mostly lowland floodplain, with some terra firma in the centre of the territory.
It is laced with rivers, stream, channels and lakes.
The main rivers are the Mapuá, Aramã  and Lado do Jacaré.

History

The Mapuá Extractive Reserve was created by presidential decree on 20 May 2005.
It is administered by the Chico Mendes Institute for Biodiversity Conservation (ICMBio).
It is classed as IUCN protected area category VI (protected area with sustainable use of natural resources).
The objective is to ensure the survival of the traditional people, their customs and way of life, and to ensure regional biodiversity.
The reserve was one of several created by president Luiz Inácio Lula da Silva at the same time, influenced by the National Council of Extractive Populations (CNS).
The conservation unit is supported by the Amazon Region Protected Areas Program.

The non-profit Residents Association of the Mapuá Extractive Reserve (AMOREMA) was created on 5 November 2005, based in the Bom Jesus community.
INCRA recognised the reserve on 20 December 2007 as an area to support 400 families of small rural producers.
The deliberative council was created on 25 June 2008.
The reserve was assigned to ICMBio on 15 March 2010.
On 23 March 2010 ICMBio granted a concession to use the reserve to AMOREMA, and on 27 April 2016 the state of Pará recognized AMOREMA as a utility.

People and economy

The families in the reserve traditionally live by subsistence agriculture, gathering forest products, hunting and artisanal fishing.
Fruits collected from the forest include açaí, bacaba, andiroba and Brazil nut.
There are fourteen riverside communities in the reserve: Santíssima Trindade, São Benedito Aramã, São Sebastião Mapuá, Bom Jesus, Vila Amélia, Santa Rita, Nazaré do Socó, São José, São Benedito Mapuá, Santa Maria, São Sebastião Canta Galo, Assembléia de Deus, Nazaré do Jacaré and Perpétuo Socorro.

Notes

Sources

2005 establishments in Brazil
Extractive reserves of Brazil
Protected areas of Pará